is a major interchange railway station in Tokyo's Minato Ward, located centrally and a 10-minute walk from the Ginza shopping district, directly south of Tokyo station.

Station layout

JR East
The JR East station consists of three surface platforms serving the Tōkaidō, Yamanote, and Keihin-Tōhoku lines, and an underground platform serving the Yokosuka Line.

Surface platforms

Underground platform

Tokyo Metro
Tokyo Metro operates in an underground station with two side platforms serving the Tokyo Metro Ginza Line.

Tokyo Metropolitan Bureau of Transportation (Toei)
Toei operates in an underground station with two side platforms serving the Toei Asakusa Line.

Yurikamome
The terminus for the Yurikamome is an elevated station next to the JR station.

History

Shimbashi is the original terminus of Japan's first stretch of railway, the Tōkaidō Main Line, and is one of Japan's oldest stations (the oldest station being , a few kilometres down the line).

With the extension of the Tōkaidō Main Line along its modern-day route to the new terminus at Tokyo Station in 1914, the original station was demolished to make way for a freight yard, Shiodome Station (汐留駅), and Karasumori Station was renamed Shimbashi Station.

Japan's first subway line, operated by the Tokyo Underground Railroad Company, was extended to Shimbashi in 1934. In January 1939, the Tokyo Rapid Railway Company built a second subway station at Shimbashi for its line from Shibuya. After several months, the lines were merged to allow through service, and the TRR station was closed. In 1941 the two companies merged forming today's Tokyo Metro Ginza Line. The Ginza Line operated from a single platform until 1980, when a second parallel platform was opened to relieve congestion.

The Toei Asakusa Line began service to Shimbashi in 1968, and the elevated Yurikamome station opened in 1995.

Shiodome Station closed in 1986. The site was declared a national monument in 1996 and the area was archeologically investigated while being redeveloped as a commercial district ("Shiosite") with a number of large office blocks. In 2003 a reconstruction of the original Shimbashi Station building and part of the platforms was completed. It currently houses a railway history exhibit and a restaurant.

The station facilities of the Ginza Line were inherited by Tokyo Metro after the privatization of the Teito Rapid Transit Authority (TRTA) in 2004.

PASMO smart card coverage at this station began operation on 18 March 2007.

Passenger statistics
In fiscal 2013, the JR East station was used by an average of 254,945 passengers daily (boarding passengers only), making it the seventh busiest station operated by JR East.

The JR East passenger figures for previous years are as shown below.

See also

 List of railway stations in Japan

References

External links

 Shimbashi Station information (JR East) 
 Shimbashi Station information (Tokyo Metro) 
 Shimbashi Station information (Toei) 
 Shimbashi Station information (Yurikamome)

Tōkaidō Main Line
Yamanote Line
Yokosuka Line
Keihin-Tōhoku Line
Tokyo Metro Ginza Line
Toei Asakusa Line
Yurikamome
Stations of East Japan Railway Company
Stations of Tokyo Metro
Stations of Tokyo Metropolitan Bureau of Transportation
Railway stations in Tokyo
Railway stations in Japan opened in 1909